Arshak Jamalyan sometimes Arshag Djamalian ( 1882 in Ganja - 1940 in Paris) was an Armenian politician. He was a prominent Dashnak member who took part in the Armenian-Azeri conflicts. Jamalian was also the Minister of Communications to Tiflis.  who served as Minister of Communication of the First Republic of Armenia in 1920.

References

External links
Arshak Djamalian - Biography

1882 births
1940 deaths
Politicians from Ganja, Azerbaijan
People of the First Republic of Armenia
Armenian Revolutionary Federation politicians
Soviet emigrants to France